Cassoday is a city in Butler County, Kansas, United States.  It is known as the "Prairie Chicken Capital of the World".  As of the 2020 census, the population of the city was 113.

History

Early history

For many millennia, the Great Plains of North America was inhabited by nomadic Native Americans.  From the 16th century to 18th century, the Kingdom of France claimed ownership of large parts of North America.  In 1762, after the French and Indian War, France secretly ceded New France to Spain, per the Treaty of Fontainebleau.

19th century
In 1802, Spain returned most of the land to France.  In 1803, most of the land for modern day Kansas was acquired by the United States from France as part of the 828,000 square mile Louisiana Purchase for 2.83 cents per acre.

In 1854, the Kansas Territory was organized, then in 1861 Kansas became the 34th U.S. state.  In 1855, Butler County was established within the Kansas Territory, which included the land for modern day Cassoday.

Cassoday was named for John B. Cassoday, chief justice of the Wisconsin Supreme Court.

The first post office was in Cassoday was established on July 9, 1906.

Geography
Cassoday is located at  (38.038545, -96.638252), in the scenic Flint Hills.

Climate
The climate in this area is characterized by hot, humid summers and generally mild to cool winters.  According to the Köppen Climate Classification system, Cassoday has a humid subtropical climate, abbreviated "Cfa" on climate maps.

Area events
 Cassoday Bike Run, First Sunday of every month March through November. As many as 5000 bikers meet in what has become a summer tradition for motorcycle enthusiasts.

Area attractions
 Cassoday Historical Museum.  It is located in the former railroad depot.

Demographics

2010 census
As of the census of 2010, there were 129 people, 55 households, and 36 families residing in the city. The racial makeup of the city was 95.3% White, 1.6% African American, 0.8% Asian, 0.8% Pacific Islander, and 1.6% from two or more races.

There were 55 households, of which 34.5% had children under the age of 18 living with them, 49.1% were married couples living together, 5.5% had a female householder with no husband present, 10.9% had a male householder with no wife present, and 34.5% were non-families. 30.9% of all households were made up of individuals, and 7.2% had someone living alone who was 65 years of age or older. The average household size was 2.35 and the average family size was 2.94.

The median age in the city was 42.8 years. 27.9% of residents were under the age of 18; 7.1% were between the ages of 18 and 24; 17.9% were from 25 to 44; 29.6% were from 45 to 64; and 17.8% were 65 years of age or older. The gender makeup of the city was 51.2% male and 48.8% female.

2000 census
As of the census of 2000, there were 130 people, 54 households, and 36 families residing in the city. The racial makeup of the city was 100.00% White. Hispanic or Latino of any race were 3.85% of the population.

There were 54 households, out of which 25.9% had children under the age of 18 living with them, 59.3% were married couples living together, 7.4% had a female householder with no husband present, and 31.5% were non-families. 29.6% of all households were made up of individuals, and 14.8% had someone living alone who was 65 years of age or older. The average household size was 2.41 and the average family size was 3.00.

In the city, the population was spread out, with 26.2% under the age of 18, 5.4% from 18 to 24, 26.9% from 25 to 44, 21.5% from 45 to 64, and 20.0% who were 65 years of age or older. The median age was 37 years. For every 100 females, there were 78.1 males. For every 100 females age 18 and over, there were 84.6 males.

The median income for a household in the city was $41,250, and the median income for a family was $49,688. Males had a median income of $31,875 versus $30,833 for females. The per capita income for the city was $17,807. There were 5.1% of families and 7.8% of the population living below the poverty line, including 19.0% of under eighteens and none of those over 64.

Government
The Cassoday government consists of a mayor and five council members.  The council meets once a month.
 City Hall, 133 South Washington Street
 U.S. Post Office, 308 East Main Street

Education
The community is served by Flinthills USD 492 public school district.  The Flinthills High School mascot is Flinthills Mustangs.

Cassoday High School was closed through school unification. The Cassoday High School mascot was Cassoday Longhorns.

Media

Print
 The El Dorado Times, regional newspaper from El Dorado.

Infrastructure

Transportation
K-177 Highway and Southern Transcon main line of BNSF Railway both go through Matfield Green, while the Kansas Turnpike toll road passes immediately north of the city with a toll plaza connected to Cassoday.

Utilities
 Internet
 Wired is provided by Wheat State Telephone (FTTH, DSL and DialUp).
 Satellite Internet is provided by HughesNet, StarBand, WildBlue.
 TV
 Satellite TV is provided by DirecTV, Dish Network.
 Free over-the-air ATSC digital TV.
 Telephone
 Landline is provided by Wheat State Telephone.
 Electricity
 City is provided by Westar Energy.
 Rural is provided by Westar Energy or Butler REC
 Gas
 Service is provided by City of Cassoday.
 Water is provided by City of Cassoday.
 City is provided by City of Cassoday.
 Rural is provided by Butler County RWD #3.
 Sewer
 Service is provided by City of Cassoday.
 Trash
 Service is provided by City of Cassoday.

Fox Lake
 Rural utilities: 
 Water, sewer, and gas provided by City of Cassoday.

See also
 Sycamore Township, Butler County, Kansas (location of Cassoday)

References

Further reading

External links

 Cassoday - Directory of Public Officials
 Cassoday, A "Quiet" town of Butler County, Kansas, History and photographs.
 Cassoday city map, KDOT
 Topo Map of Cassoday area, USGS

Cities in Kansas
Cities in Butler County, Kansas
Wichita, KS Metropolitan Statistical Area